Whitchurch Rural is a civil parish in Shropshire, England.

It covers the area (that is in Shropshire) to the south and southeast of the town of Whitchurch, including the villages of Prees Heath, Tilstock and Broughall.
The civil parish population at the 2011 census was 1,533.

It was created in 1894 under the Local Government Act 1894 from that part of the parish of Whitchurch which was part of the Whitchurch urban district. It formed part of the Whitchurch Rural District from 1894 to 1934, when it became part of the Wem Rural District. It then became part of North Shropshire Rural District in 1967.

References 

Civil parishes in Shropshire